Alan Ball (born June 21, 1943) is an American weightlifter. He competed in the men's heavyweight event at the 1972 Summer Olympics.

References

External links
 

1943 births
Living people
American male weightlifters
Olympic weightlifters of the United States
Weightlifters at the 1972 Summer Olympics
Sportspeople from Syracuse, New York
20th-century American people
21st-century American people